Virginia E. Belmont, also spelled Virginia Belmonte (September 20, 1921 – May 6, 2014), was an American film actress.

Born in New York City, she moved to California as a child. She attended San Diego High School and San Diego State College and  graduated from UCLA and then started working as a cigarette girl at Mocambo. Belmont received her first acting role, uncredited, in the 1944 film Black Arrow. Following a number of supporting roles for Metro-Goldwyn-Mayer and RKO films, she was put under contract with Monogram Pictures, starring in several B-movies as the heroine opposite William Boyd, Jimmy Wakely, and Johnny Mack Brown, among others.

In 1941  Belmont married the native-born Italian restaurateur Albert Califano, and in the late 1940s they moved to Rome, where she continued her film career in the Italian industry, starring in a number of melodrama films, while Califano worked as a correspondent for The Hollywood Reporter.  In the late 1950s she retired from acting and moved back in the U.S., where she  was employed by United Airlines as a sales representative.

Selected filmography
 Night Taxi (1950)
 The Mysteries of Venice (1951)
 Beauties on Motor Scooters (1952)
 Silent Conflict (1948)
 Oklahoma Blues (1948)
 The Rangers Ride (1948)
 Courtin' Trouble (1948)
 Prairie Express (1947)

References

External links

Obituary

1921 births
2014 deaths
American film actresses
Actresses from Boston
20th-century American actresses
University of California, Los Angeles alumni
Italian film actresses
American emigrants to Italy
21st-century American women

San Diego High School alumni